Kokhanovskoye is a rural locality (a selo) in Kardonovsky Selsoviet, Kizlyarsky District, Republic of Dagestan, Russia. The population was 1,071 as of 2010. There are 3 streets.

Geography 
Kokhanovskoye is located 21 km east of Kizlyar (the district's administrative centre) by road. Nekrasovka and Novonadezhdovka are the nearest rural localities.

Nationalities 
Dargins, Avars, Laks, Russians and Azerbaijanis live there.

References 

Rural localities in Kizlyarsky District